The Palatine Class G 1I steam locomotives were goods train engines belonging to the Palatine Railways.

Description 
These engines were the first Type Hall unites built by Maffei. In addition they had an eccentric crank of the Hall type. This was partly external and partly internal, a feature of engines in Bavaria and the Palatinate. The boiler was entirely dome-less and had a semi-circular outer firebox above. They were equipped with Type 3 T 6 tenders.

References 

G 1.I
Railway locomotives introduced in 1853
Maffei locomotives
Standard gauge locomotives of Germany
Freight locomotives
2-4-0 locomotives